The Rotron RT600 is a series British aircraft engines, designed and produced by Rotron Power Ltd of Semley, Wiltshire for use in unmanned aerial vehicles, light aircraft and helicopters.

Design and development
The engine is a dual-rotor Wankel engine,  displacement, liquid-cooled, gasoline/jet fuel engine design. It can be employed direct-drive or with a toothed poly V belt reduction drive. It employs dual electronic ignition and produces  at 7500 rpm, depending on the model.

Variants
RT600 Jet-A1
Model that runs on Jet A-1 fuel, with a compression ratio of 8.5:1 and produces  at 7500 rpm.
RT600 LCR
Model that runs on gasoline or avgas, with a compression ratio of 9.6:1 and produces  at 7500 rpm.
RT600 LCR-EXE
Model that runs on gasoline or avgas, with a compression ratio of 9.6:1 and produces  at 5000 rpm.
RT600 XE
Model that runs on gasoline, with a compression ratio of 9.5:1 and produces  at 7500 rpm.

Specifications (Rotron RT600 Jet-A1)

See also

References

External links

Rotron aircraft engines
Pistonless rotary engine